Patchin is a hamlet in the town of Boston in Erie County, New York, United States.

Major landmarks include the Boston Town Hall and a New York State Police barracks (Troop A).

References

Hamlets in New York (state)
Hamlets in Erie County, New York